A sexual slur is a term of disparagement used to refer to members of a given gender, sex, or sexual orientation in a derogatory or pejorative manner. The motivation for using a sexual slur is often sexism and/or bias against a sexual orientation or practice.

Many sexual slurs are used in a wide range of contexts outside of their primary meaning; for example, gay may be used as a term of disparagement to refer to any person or thing the speaker thinks is worthy of contempt (e.g. "Those sneakers are gay"). Used in this way, the slur conveys contempt by associating its target with an (implicitly despised) sexual minority.

See also
List of racial slurs
Vulgarism
Slurs
Sexual slang
Pejorative
Flyting

Reference List

External links

 Amatory Thesaurus
 Sex Dictionary — lists non-slang terms and some slang
 The World's Largest Collection of Masturbation Synonyms

Profanity
 
Euphemisms
Prudishness

es:Jerga sexual
nl:Seksuele volkstaal en eufemismen
pl:Słownictwo seksualne
pt:Gíria sexual